Cristiano Del Grosso (born 24 March 1983) is an Italian footballer who plays as a left back. He is the twin brother of Federico, who is also a defender.

Club career

Siena
Del Grosso renewed his contract with Siena on 15 June 2011, signing a new 2-year contract.

Venezia
On 18 August 2017 newly promoted Serie B side Venezia signed Del Grosso for the 2017–18 season.

Pescara
On 17 July 2018 he signed with Serie B club Pescara.

Real Giulianova
On 5 September 2020 he returned to his native city and joined Real Giulianova in Serie D.

Casertana
On 1 January 2021 he signed with Serie C club Casertana.

References

External links

1983 births
Living people
People from Giulianova
Footballers from Abruzzo
Italian twins
Twin sportspeople
Italian footballers
Association football defenders
Serie A players
Serie B players
Serie C players
Giulianova Calcio players
Ascoli Calcio 1898 F.C. players
Cagliari Calcio players
A.C.N. Siena 1904 players
Atalanta B.C. players
S.S.C. Bari players
S.P.A.L. players
Venezia F.C. players
Delfino Pescara 1936 players
Casertana F.C. players
Sportspeople from the Province of Teramo